V-type proton ATPase subunit E 2 is an enzyme that in humans is encoded by the ATP6V1E2 gene.

References

External links

Further reading